Neodesha (YTB-815) was a United States Navy .

Construction

The contract for Neodesha was awarded on 22 June 1970. She was laid down on 10 May 1971 at Sturgeon Bay, Wisconsin, by Peterson Builders and launched 6 October 1971.

Operational history

Neodesha served the 14th Naval District at Pearl Harbor, Hawaii.

On 3 August 2007 she was reclassified as an unclassified miscellaneous vessel, given the hull number IX-540. Neodesha is assigned to Mobile Diving and Salvage Unit One as a non-operational training hulk.

References

External links

 

Natick-class large harbor tugs

Ships built by Peterson Builders
1971 ships